The Kingman Standard, or The Standard, is a local weekly newspaper in Kingman owned by Mohave County Newspapers, Inc. It has a circulation of 8,062. The newspaper is published once a week on Wednesday, and is distributed in Kingman, Bullhead City, Lake Havasu City and Laughlin, Nevada.

References

External links

Kingman, Arizona
Mass media in Mohave County, Arizona
Newspapers published in Arizona